Planet Earth: The Future is a 2006 BBC documentary series on the environment and conservation, produced by the BBC Natural History Unit as a companion to the multi-award-winning nature documentary Planet Earth. The programmes were originally broadcast on BBC Four immediately after the final three episodes of Planet Earth on BBC One. Each episode highlights the conservation issues surrounding some of the species and environments featured in Planet Earth, using interviews with the film-makers and eminent figures from the fields of science, conservation, politics, and theology. The programmes are narrated by Simon Poland and the series producer was Fergus Beeley.

Background
When the first episodes of Planet Earth were broadcast in the UK, the producers were criticised by some green campaigners for glossing over the environmental problems faced by the planet. Executive producer Alastair Fothergill defended the approach, explaining that a heavy-handed environmental message would not work on primetime BBC One. However, the Planet Earth film crews witnessed first-hand scenes of environmental degradation and the increasing scarcity of wildlife in some of the shooting locations. This experience formed the basis of Planet Earth - The Future, which was designed to engage viewers in a mature debate about environmental issues.

The following year, the BBC commissioned Saving Planet Earth, the second overtly conservation-themed series to be shown on BBC One. The first BBC series to deal comprehensively with conservation was State of the Planet in 2000.

Episodes

Participants
The following is an alphabetical list of the interviewees featured in the series, with their titles and professions as credited on screen:

 Neville Ash, World Conservation Monitoring Centre, UN Environment Programme
 David Attenborough, broadcaster
 Ulises Blanco, farmer
 Mark Brownlow, producer, Planet Earth
 Martyn Colbeck, cameraman, Planet Earth
 James Connaughton, senior White House environmental advisor
 Huw Cordey, producer, Planet Earth
 Robert Costanza, professor of ecological economics, University of Vermont
 Ahmed Djoghlaf, executive secretary, Convention on Biological Diversity, UN Environment Programme
 Betsy Dresser, senior vice president, Audubon Nature Institute
 Johan Eliasch, entrepreneur
 Simon Evans, big game hunter
 Alastair Fothergill, series producer, Planet Earth
 David Greer, park advisor, World Wide Fund for Nature
 Chadden Hunter, wildlife biologist
 Tony Juniper, executive director, Friends of the Earth
 Peyton Knight, National Center for Public Policy Research
 Marek Kryda, consultant, Animal Welfare Institute, Poland
 James Leape, Director General, Worldwide Fund for Nature (WWF International)
 Moisés Léon, Tropical Science Center
 Mark Linfield, producer, Planet Earth
 James Lovelock, independent scientist and proponent of the Gaia hypothesis
 Barbara Maas, chief executive, Care for the Wild International
 Professor Wangari Maathai, founder, Green Belt Movement
 Richard Mabey, writer
 Jeffrey A. McNeely, chief scientist, World Conservation Union
 Nisar Malik, conservationist
 Tony Martin, Natural Environment Research Council
 Professor Robert M. May, University of Oxford
 E.J. Milner-Gulland, Imperial College London
 Russell Mittermeier, president, Conservation International
 Henry Ndede, chairman, Friends of Nairobi National Park, Kenya
 Craig Packer, ecologist
 Martin Palmer, chief executive, Alliance of Religions and Conservation
 Roger Payne, president, Ocean Alliance
 Jonathon Porritt, chair, Sustainable Development Commission, UK
 Sandra Postel, author and global water analyst
 Mark Stanley Price, chief executive, Durrell Wildlife Conservation Trust
 Carlos Quesada, University of Costa Rica
 Adam Ravetch, cameraman & Arctic wildlife specialist
 M. Sanjayan, Lead Scientist, The Nature Conservancy
 Clare Short, former Secretary of State for International Development
 Sakana Ole Turede, chair, Kitengela Pastoral Land Owners Association, Kenya
 Jan Kees Vis, director of sustainable agriculture, Unilever
 Robert Watson, chief scientist, World Bank
 Rowan Williams, Archbishop of Canterbury
 E. O. Wilson, professor Emeritus, Harvard University

DVD and book
 All three episodes of Planet Earth - The Future are included as a bonus feature on the fifth disc of the British and North American versions of the Planet Earth DVD box set (BBCDVD1883 in the UK). It was omitted from the HD DVD and Blu-ray sets because of the mixture of standard and high-definition footage.
 An accompanying book, Planet Earth - The Future: What the Experts Say, was published by BBC Books on 5 October 2006. The editors are Rosamund Kidman-Cox and Fergus Beeley, and Jonathon Porritt wrote the foreword.

See also
 Planet Earth, the television series which spawned Planet Earth - The Future
 Earth, the associated feature film released in 2007
 Saving Planet Earth, a BBC series highlighting the plight of endangered species broadcast in 2007
 Media coverage of climate change
 Effects of global warming

References

External links
 

2006 British television series debuts
2006 British television series endings
BBC television documentaries
Documentary films about nature
Documentary films about environmental issues
Environmental conservation
Planet Earth (franchise)